Engamma Sapatham is a 1974 Indian Tamil-language film, directed by S. P. Muthuraman and produced by S. Baskar. The film stars R. Muthuraman, Sivakumar, Jayachitra and Vidhubala. It was released on 4 October 1974. The film was remade in Telugu as Ammayila Sapatham (1975), in Kannada as Vasantha Lakshmi (1978) and subsequently in Tamil as Vanaja Girija (1994).

Plot

Cast 

R. Muthuraman as Sundaram
Sivakumar as Kumaran
Jayachitra as Chithra
Vidhubala as Geetha
Major Sundarrajan in Guest appearance
Thengai Srinivasan in Guest appearance
Suruli Rajan
Senthamarai
Vennira Aadai Moorthy
Usilai Mani
Manorama
M. N. Rajam in Guest appearance
Sukumari
S. A. Ashokan
Vijaya Chandrika
Shanti
 Master Sekhar

Soundtrack 
The music was composed by Vijaya Bhaskar. Vijaya Bhaskar later reused the tune of the song "Anbu Megame" in the Kannada remake Vasantha Lakshmi (1978) as "Belli Modave".

References

External links 
 

1970s Tamil-language films
1974 films
Films directed by S. P. Muthuraman
Films scored by Vijaya Bhaskar
Films with screenplays by Panchu Arunachalam
Tamil films remade in other languages